Bouandougou is a town in central Ivory Coast. It is a sub-prefecture of Mankono Department in Béré Region, Woroba District.

Bouandougou was a commune until March 2012, when it became one of 1126 communes nationwide that were abolished.
In 2014, the population of the sub-prefecture of Bouandougou was 35,671.

Villages
The twenty one villages of the sub-prefecture of Bouandougou and their population in 2014 are:

Notes

Sub-prefectures of Béré Region
Former communes of Ivory Coast